The 2015 Scotland Sevens was the eighth tournament within the 2014–15 Sevens World Series. This year's Scotland Sevens tournament was held over the weekend of 9–10 May 2015 at Scotstoun Stadium in Glasgow.

Format
The teams were drawn into four pools of four teams each. Each team will play everyone in their pool once. The top two teams from each pool advance to the Cup/Plate brackets. The bottom two teams go into the Bowl/Shield brackets.

Teams
The pools and schedule were announced on 5 April 2015.

Pool Stage

Pool A

Pool B

Pool C

Pool D

Knockout stage

Shield

Bowl

Plate

Cup

References

External links
Official website

Scotland Sevens
Scotland Sevens
Scotland Sevens
Scotland Sevens